Quintet (Basel) 1977 is an album by the American composer and saxophonist Anthony Braxton, recorded in Switzerland in 1977 but not released on the hatOLOGY label until 2000.

Reception

The Allmusic review by Steve Loewy awarded the album 4½ stars stating, "This super quintet meets expectations, and the historically important set should achieve some sort of critical, if not cult, status." On All About Jazz, Glenn Astarita noted, "Overall, these amazingly fresh and novel performances serve as a testament to a musician who, over the last three decades, has almost single-handedly altered the course of modern jazz and composition. Highly recommended!" In JazzTimes Ron Wynn wrote "Trombonist George Lewis' floating, often humorous recants to Braxton's leaps and darts on alto sax, sopranino and clarinet, as well as Muhal Richard Abrams' masterful accompaniment and measured yet bluesy playing, make the four lengthy numbers engrossing. The highlight is the almost 27-minute "Composition 69 N/G," which gets bolstered by edgy bass work from Mark Helias and reliable percussive tapestry provided by Charles "Bobo" Shaw. Shaw's spirited drumming brings some funk and fire to the date, while Abrams imbues it with dignity and Lewis gives it spunk".

Track listing
All compositions by Anthony Braxton.

 "Composition 69 J" - 16:25 
 "Composition 69 N/G" - 26:02 
 "Composition 69 M" - 12:52 
 "Composition 40 B" - 18:16 
Recorded at Safranzunft in Basel, Switzerland, on June 2, 1977

Personnel
Anthony Braxton - sopranino saxophone, clarinet, alto saxophone
George Lewis - trombone
Muhal Richard Abrams - piano
Mark Helias - double bass
Charles "Bobo" Shaw - drums

References

Hathut Records live albums
Anthony Braxton live albums
2000 live albums